Artigues | Sant Adrià is a Barcelona Metro station in Badalona, named after the neighbourhood of the same name. Despite the latter part of the name, it is not in Sant Adrià del Besòs, and the tag Badalona was added to all signage in the station to avoid confusion. It is served by L2 (purple line). It opened in 1985 with the name Joan XXIII as part of L4 and became a L2 station in 2002. It can be accessed from Carretera de Santa Coloma and from Avinguda de Joan XXIII.

Services

See also
List of Barcelona Metro stations

External links

Trenscat.com

Barcelona Metro line 2 stations
Railway stations in Badalona
Transport in Sant Adrià de Besòs
Railway stations in Spain opened in 1985